Hilda Antes (12 June 1929 – 12 January 2016) was a German sprinter. She competed in the women's 4 × 100 metres relay and women's 80 metres hurdles at the 1952 Summer Olympics representing Saar.

See also
 Saar at the 1952 Summer Olympics

References

1929 births
2016 deaths
Athletes (track and field) at the 1952 Summer Olympics
German female sprinters
German female hurdlers
Olympic athletes of Saar
Place of birth missing
Saar athletes